Jozef (Jos) C.N. Raadschelders is a scholar of public administration. He is a professor at the John Glenn College of Public Affairs at Ohio State University and also held an honorary appointment at the University of Leiden (2011-2022).[1] At the Glenn College he serves as the Associate Dean for Faculty (since 2013) and as the Faculty Director for Professional Development Programs (since 2018). His complete curriculum vitae can be accessed at the Glenn College’s website (http://glenn.osu.edu/faculty/glenn-faculty/raadschelders/).

Education 
He received his Ph.D. in the Social Sciences from the Department of Public Administration at the University of Leiden (1990), an MA in history (with minors in public administration and international relations) from the University of Leiden (1982), and a BA in history and textiles from Teachers College, Delft, The Netherlands (1979).

Academic career 
Raadschelders is the former managing editor of Public Administration Review (PAR) (2006–2011) and in 2012 received the Chester A. Newland Presidential Citation of Merit from the American Society of Public Administration.[2] In 2014 he was elected Fellow of the National Academy of Public Administration (NAPA).[3] In February 2023 the ASPA president and board announced that Katherine Willoughby and he will serve as the next editors of PAR (2024-2026).

So far, he has co-authored and co-edited 21 books and more than 160 articles within the interdisciplinary study of public administration. He has also written more than 50 book reviews (of which quite a few as book review essays). He received ASPA’s Laverne Burchfield Award for the best book review in PAR (2017).[4] Together with R.A.W. Rhodes he edits since 2018 a Palgrave Pivot series on the “Foundations of Government and Public Administration.”[5]

Raadschelders' research has covered three broad areas, including administrative history (or history of government), comparative administration, and the nature of government and its study of public administration. He has also written on a variety of other topics such as (comparative) water management, education, policing, political-administrative relations, influence of war and occupation on national administrative systems, civil service, eastern and western civil service traditions, public administration in South Africa, refugee migration, organization theory, local government in the Netherlands, public sector ethics and integrity, meso-level government, (de)centralization, among others.

Considering the top five publications in his Google Scholar citation record, he is best known for his work on the nature of government and its study. This started in the late 1990s with a series of articles on the nature of the study. Some of the articles and several new chapters culminated in a 2011-book, Public Administration: The Interdisciplinary Study of Government (Oxford University Press). It has received several positive reviews in the journals of public administration.[6][7][8][9][10] In his 2020-book The Three Ages of Government: From the Person, to the Group, to the World (University of Michigan Press)[11], he explores the nature of government from its origins some 10,000 years ago. In both books he crosses all three main areas of his interest, historical, comparative, and epistemological/ontological perspectives upon government and its study.

References

Living people
Ohio State University faculty
Dutch public administration scholars
Year of birth missing (living people)